Gülkoru is a village in the Malazgirt district of Muş Province, Turkey

Geography 
It is 11 km from Malazgirt.

Population

References 

Villages in Muş Province